DUX Logroño is a Spanish women's football club based in Logroño, that currently plays in Primera Federación.

History
The origins of the entity go back to the year 2000, when a project for the integration of schools and educational centres of Logroño is carried out, although the institution is officially founded in 2008 with teams of all ages, including the female senior team. On 3 June 2018, the women's team promoted to Primera División after defeating CD Tacón in the promotion playoffs. The team made their debut in the 2018–19 season, successfully avoiding relegation after ending in the 11th position.

On 7 October 2020, Logroño qualified for the final of the Copa de la Reina.

On 1 July 2021, Logroño was bought by DUX Gaming (whose partners are footballers Thibaut Courtois, Borja Iglesias, and YouTuber DjMariio) and it was renamed as DUX Logroño.

Season by season

Players

Current squad

Reserve team

See also
:Category:EdF Logroño players 
DUX Internacional de Madrid

References

External links
 EDF Logroño Official website 
 
 
EDF Logroño at Txapeldunak

Sport in Logroño
Women's football clubs in Spain
2008 establishments in Spain
Association football clubs established in 2008
Primera División (women) clubs
Football clubs in La Rioja (Spain)
Segunda Federación (women) clubs
Primera Federación (women) clubs